Petr Ulrych (born 21 February 1944) is a Czech musician as well as film and theatre composer, brother of Hana Ulrychová, with whom he leads the folk band Javory and its rock-oriented cousin, Javory Beat. In the 1960s, the duo played in the band Vulkán and later formed Atlantis.

Life and career
After finishing high school, Ulrych studied aeronautical engineering at the military academy in Brno, as well as studying the piano privately and the double bass at the Brno Conservatory for two years. In 1961, he co-founded the Divadlo bez tradic theatre in Brno, where he was later joined by his younger sister Hana. In 1964, he joined the rock band Vulkán and three years later, formed the rock group Atlantis together with Hana.

During the Normalization era in Czechoslovakia, the band's rock sound was forbidden, as were Ulrych's politically themed lyrics, causing him to abandon the group and form the folk-tinged project Javory, again with Hana in tow. Years later, he returned to his original beat style with the rock-oriented cousin project Javory Beat.

Ulrych has also composed music for film and theatrical productions. In 2001, he won the Alfréd Radok Award for Koločava at the Brno City Theatre.

Selected musical work

Scores
 Sonáta pro zrzku (1980)
 O statečném kováři (1983)
 My holky z městečka (1985)
 Thanks for Every New Morning (1994)

Discography
With Atlantis
 Odyssea (1969 – not released until 1990)

With Hana Ulrychová
 13 HP (1971)
 Hej dámy, děti a páni (1972)
 Hana & Petr (1974)
 Nikola šuhaj loupežník (1974 – with Orchestr Gustava Broma)
 Meč a přeslice (1975)
 Best Of – ze starých LP (1998)

With Javory
 Ententýny (1978)
 Zpívání (1982)
 Zpívání při vínečku (1983)
 Bylinky (1985)
 Příběh (1987)
 To nejlepší s Javory (1994)

Solo
 Cestou k tichému hlasu (1991)
 Bílá místa (1993)
 O naději (1997)
 Pokoj lidem dobré vůle (1998)
 Seď a tiše poslouchej (1999)
 Malé zrnko písku (1999)
 Koločava (2002)
 Šumaři (2003)
 Písně (2005)
 Stromy, voda, tráva (2006)
 Čtyřicet nej (2007)
 Bratr sestry (2012)
 Půlstoletí (1964–2014) (2014)

References

External links

 Javory official website

1944 births
Living people
Czech male singers
Brno Conservatory alumni